SISNE plus is a DOS 3.3 compatible clone created by Itautec and Scopus Tecnologia in Brazil prior to the end of the Market Reserve in 1991, which, at that time, forbade the importation of electronic equipment and software for general use. 
The system was sold with PC/XT compatible Itautec IS 30 computers and with Itautec IS 386 computers.
With the widespread use of MS-DOS after the importations were allowed, the SISNE plus operating system was discontinued.

Before SISNE plus, Scopus developed and offered SISNE. Version 1.6 was compatible to DOS 1.1 and had the same user interface as CP/M-80.

Releases

Commands
The following list of commands are supported by SISNE plus 3.30 R05.

 AJUDA
 APPEND
 ASSIGN
 ATTRIB
 BACKUP
 BEEP
 BRASCII
 BREAK
 BUFIM
 CALL
 CD
 CHDIR
 CHKDSK
 CLS
 COM
 COMENT
 COMMAND
 COMP
 CONV
 COP
 COPIA
 COPY
 CTTY
 DAT
 DATA
 DATE
 DEL
 DIR
 DIRET
 DISKCOMP
 DISKCOPY
 ECHO
 ECO
 EDITOR
 ERASE
 EXIT
 FASTOPEN
 FBACKIM
 FBACKUP
 FDISK
 FFORMAT
 FIND
 FOR
 FORMAT
 FRESTIM
 FRESTORE
 GOTO
 GRAFTABL
 GRAPHICS
 GRAVA
 HOR
 HORA
 ICC
 IF
 IMP86
 JOIN
 LABEL
 LAND
 LISTA
 MD
 MENU
 MKDIR
 MODE
 MORE
 MOS
 MOSTRA
 PATH
 PAU
 PAUSA
 PAUSE
 PREAJUDA
 PRINT
 PROMPT
 RD
 RECOVER
 REM
 REN
 RENAME
 RENOMAIA
 REPLACE
 RESTORE
 RMDIR
 RX86
 SET
 SHARE
 SHIFT
 SORT
 SUBST
 SUP
 SUPRIME
 SYS
 TECLAS
 TIME
 TREE
 TRUNC
 TX86
 TYPE
 VER
 VERIFY
 VOL
 XCOPY

See also
 Comparison of DOS operating systems
 Timeline of DOS operating systems
 List of DOS commands
 SOX (operating system)

References

Further reading

External links
  

DOS variants
Disk operating systems
1988 software
Information technology in Brazil